Polinices leptaleus is a species of predatory sea snail, a marine gastropod mollusk in the family Naticidae, the moon snails.

Distribution

Description 
The maximum recorded shell length is 8.9 mm.

Habitat 
Minimum recorded depth is 538 m. Maximum recorded depth is 1170 m.

References

External links

Naticidae
Gastropods described in 1881